The Lircay River is a tributary of the Claro River, near the city of Talca in Chile. It is not to be confused with the Lircay River of Linares.

See also
List of rivers of Chile

References

Rivers of Chile
Rivers of Maule Region